Lĩnh Nam chích quái ( lit. "Selection of Strange Tales in Lĩnh Nam") is a 14th-century Vietnamese semi-fictional work written in Han scripts by Trần Thế Pháp. The title indicates strange tales "plucked from the dust" of the Lingnan region of Southern China and Northern Vietnam.

Later editors who worked on the collection include Vũ Quỳnh (1452–1516) and Kiều Phú (1447–?).

History

See also
Việt Điện U Linh Tập

References

External links
 The Ming-occupation-period origins of the Lĩnh Nam Chích Quái ?

Vietnamese history texts
Vietnamese short story collections
Chinese-language literature of Vietnam